The 1897 William & Mary Orange and White football team represented the College of William & Mary during the 1897 college football season.

Schedule

References

William and Mary
William & Mary Tribe football seasons
College football winless seasons
William and Mary Orange and White football